Kjeld is a person name derived from the Old Norse and may refer to:

Given name 
Saint Kjeld (fl. 1100–1150), Danish clergyman
Kjeld Abell (1901–1961), Danish playwright and theatrical designer
Kjeld Ammentorp (1895–1975), Danish-British businessesman
Kjeld Bonfils (1918–1984), Danish jazz pianist and vibraphone player
Kjeld Hillingsø (born 1935), Danish Army general
Kjeld Stub Irgens (1879–1963), Norwegian politician 
Kjeld Jacobsen (1915–1970), Danish actor
Kjeld Kirk Kristiansen (born 1947), the president and CEO of Lego between 1979 and 2004
Kjeld Langeland (1920–1973), Norwegian politician for the Conservative Party
Kjeld Nielsen (1887–1910), Danish athlete
Kjeld Nuis (born 1989), Dutch speed skater
Kjeld Olesen (born 1932), Danish former Social Democratic politician
Kjeld Østrøm (born 1933), Danish rower 
Kjeld Petersen (1920–1962), Danish film actor
Kjeld Philip (1912–1989), Danish economist and politician representing the Danish Social Liberal Party
Kjeld Rimberg (born 1943), Norwegian businessman
Kjeld Steen (1925–2005), Danish boxer
Kjeld Stub (1607–1663), Danish-Norwegian priest
Kjeld Stub (1868–1955), Norwegian priest and politician
Kjeld Thorst (born 1940), Danish footballer
Kjeld Toft-Christensen (1910–1945), Danish Special Operations Executive officer WWII resistance fighter
Kjeld Tolstrup (1965–2011), Danish radio DJ
Kjeld Vibe (1927–2011), Norwegian diplomat

Middle name 
Hans Kjeld Rasmussen (born 1954), Danish sports shooter and Olympic Champion

See also
Ketil
Kjetil
Kjell

Danish masculine given names
Norwegian masculine given names

da:Kjeld
no:Kjell
nn:Kjell
sv:Kjell